Halichondria is a genus of sea sponges belonging to the family Halichondriidae.
These are massive, amorphous sponges with clearly separated inner and outer skeletons consisting of bundles of spicules arranged in a seemingly random pattern.

This genus of sponges became important through the discovery of cell division limiting properties of the extract Halichondrin B, which inhibits cell mitosis. The drug Eribulin, a related compound and an inhibitor of microtubule function, has become an important chemotherapy treatment for certain types of cancer.

Species
The following species are recognised in the genus Halichondria:
 Subgenus Eumastia Schmidt, 1870
 Halichondria attenuata (Topsent, 1915)
 Halichondria maraensis Kim & Sim, 2009
 Halichondria schmidti Dendy, 1895
 Halichondria sitiens (Schmidt, 1870)
 Subgenus Halichondria Fleming, 1828
 Halichondria adelpha de Laubenfels, 1954
 Halichondria agglomerans Cabioch, 1968
 Halichondria aldabrensis Lévi, 1961
 Halichondria almae (Carballo, Uriz & García-Gómez, 1996)
 Halichondria arenacea Dendy, 1895
 Halichondria arenosa Hentschel, 1929
 Halichondria axinelloides Swartschewsky, 1906
 Halichondria bowerbanki Burton, 1930
 Halichondria brondstedi De Laubenfels, 1936
 Halichondria brunnea (Schmidt, 1868)
 Halichondria cancellosa (Carter, 1886)
 Halichondria capensis Samaai & Gibbons, 2005
 Halichondria carotenoidea Alvarez & Hooper, 2011
 Halichondria cartilaginea (Esper, 1794)
 Halichondria cebimarensis Carvalho & Hajdu, 2001
 Halichondria coerulea Bergquist, 1967
 Halichondria colossea Lundbeck, 1902
 Halichondria contorta (Sarà, 1961)
 Halichondria convolvens Sarà, 1960
 Halichondria cornuloides Burton, 1954
 Halichondria cristata Sarà, 1978
 Halichondria cylindrata Tanita & Hoshino, 1989
 Halichondria darwinensis Hooper, Cook, Hobbs & Kennedy, 1997
 Halichondria diazae Van Soest & Hooper, 2020
 Halichondria diversispiculata Burton, 1930
 Halichondria dubia (Czerniavsky, 1880)
 Halichondria elenae Gastaldi, De Paula, Narvarte, Lôbo-Hajdu & Hajdu, 2018
 Halichondria fallax (Marshall, 1892)
 Halichondria flexuosa (Sarà, 1978)
 Halichondria foetida (Wilson, 1894)
 Halichondria foraminosa (Czerniavsky, 1880)
 Halichondria fragilis Kieschnick, 1896
 Halichondria gageoenesis Kang & Sim, 2008
 Halichondria genitrix (Schmidt, 1870)
 Halichondria gilvus Samaai & Gibbons, 2005
 Halichondria glabrata Keller, 1891
 Halichondria heterorrhaphis Breitfuss, 1912
 Halichondria intermedia Brøndsted, 1924
 Halichondria isthmica (Keller, 1883)
 Halichondria japonica (Kadota, 1922)
 Halichondria knowltoni Bergquist, 1961
 Halichondria labiata Hentschel, 1929
 Halichondria lambei Brøndsted, 1933
 Halichondria lendenfeldi Lévi, 1961
 Halichondria leuconoides Topsent, 1890
 Halichondria longispicula (Czerniavsky, 1880)
 Halichondria lutea Alcolado, 1984
 Halichondria magniconulosa Hechtel, 1965
 Halichondria marianae Santos, Nascimento & Pinheiro, 2018
 Halichondria melanadocia Laubenfels, 1936
 Halichondria membranacea (Sarà, 1978)
 Halichondria microbiana Alvarez & Hooper, 1911
 Halichondria migottea Carvalho & Hajdu, 2001
 Halichondria minuta Keller, 1891
 Halichondria modesta (Pulitzer-Finali, 1986)
 Halichondria moorei Bergquist, 1961
 Halichondria muanensis Kang & Sim, 2008
 Halichondria nigrocutis (Carter, 1886)
 Halichondria normani Burton, 1930
 Halichondria oblonga (Hansen, 1885)
 Halichondria okada (Kadota, 1922)
 Halichondria osculum Lundbeck, 1902
 Halichondria oshoro Tanita, 1961
 Halichondria oxiparva (Sarà, 1978)
 Halichondria panicea (Pallas, 1766)
 Halichondria papillaris (Pallas, 1766)
 Halichondria pelliculata Ridley & Dendy, 1886
 Halichondria phakellioides Dendy & Frederick, 1924
 Halichondria poa (de Laubenfels, 1947)
 Halichondria pontica (Czerniavsky, 1880)
 Halichondria prostrata Thiele, 1905
 Halichondria punctata Bergquist, 1970
 Halichondria renieroides (Fristedt, 1887)
 Halichondria semitubulosa (Lamarck, 1814)
 Halichondria solidior (Schmidt, 1870)
 Halichondria stylata Diaz, Pomponi & Van Soest, 1993
 Halichondria suberosa (Esper, 1794)
 Halichondria sulfurea Carvalho & Hajdu, 2001
 Halichondria surrubicunda Hoshino, 1981
 Halichondria syringea Pulitzer-Finali, 1996
 Halichondria tenebrica Carvalho & Hajdu, 2001
 Halichondria tenuiramosa Dendy, 1922
 Halichondria tenuispiculata Brøndsted, 1916
 Halichondria turritella (Schmidt, 1870)
 Halichondria velamentosa (Hansen, 1885)
 Subgenus unassigned
 Halichondria albescens sensu Johnston, 1842
 Halichondria flava (Merejkowski, 1878)
 Halichondria hongdoenesis Kang & Sim, 2008
 Halichondria kelleri Van Soest & Hooper, 2020
 Halichondria lona Laubenfels, 1936
 Halichondria magellanica Dendy, 1924
 Halichondria ulleungensis Kang & Sim, 2008

References

Halichondrida